The year 1614 in music involved some significant musical events.

Events 
Hymn-writer Melchior Teschner becomes pastor at Oberpritschen.

Publications 
Agostino Agazzari – 4 Masses, Op. 17 (Venice: Ricciardo Amadino)
Giovanni Francesco Anerio
 (Rome: Giovanni Battista Robletti), also includes a Venite exultemus and a Te Deum
 (Rome: Giovanni Battista Robletti)
First book of masses (Rome: Giovanni Battista Robletti)
Adriano Banchieri –  for eight voices (Bologna: Giovanni Rossi)
Bartolomeo Barbarino
Second book of motets for solo voice, either soprano or tenor (Venice: Bartolomeo Magno for Gardano)
Cesare Bendinelli – Tutta L'Arte della Trombetta, a collection of lessons for the trumpet.
Valerio Bona –  (Six Italian canzonas for concerted playing by two choirs in echo, very easily & comfortably), Op. 21 (Venice: Giacomo Vincenti)
William Brade –  for six (Hamburg: Michael Hering), a collection of dance music
Antonio Brunelli
Various exercises for one or two voices, for cornetto, flute, and violins (Florence: Zanobi Pignoni)
Giulio Caccini – Nuove musiche e nuova maniera di scriverle, con due arie particolari per tenore, che ricerchi le corde del basso (Florence: Zanobi Pignoni)
Antonio Cifra
Seventh book of motets for two, three, and four voices, Op. 16 (Rome: Giovanni Battista Robletti)
 for one, two, three, and four voices, to be sung over a harpsichord, archlute, or similar instrument (Venice: Giacomo Vincenti)
Christoph Demantius –  (New German Songs) for five voices, part 1 (Leipzig: Valentin am Ende for Thomas Schürer)
Giacomo Finetti – Psalms for three voices with organ bass (Venice: Bartolomeo Magni for Gardano)
Melchior Franck
 for four and five voices (Nuremberg: Georg Leopold Fuhrmann), secular songs and dances for voices and instruments
 for four voices (Coburg: Fürstliche Druckerei for Justus Hauck), a funeral motet
 for four voices (Coburg: Kaspar Bertsch), a wedding motet
 for eight voices (Coburg: Fürstliche Druckerei for Justus Hauck), a wedding motet
 (Two New Wedding Songs) for four and five voices (Coburg: Fürstliche Druckerei for Justus Hauck)
Marco da Gagliano – Masses and motets for six voices (Florence: Zanobi Pignoni)
Adam Gumpelzhaimer – , book two, for eight voices and organ bass (Augsburg: Valentin Schönigk)
Filipe de Magalhães –  (Lisbon)
Claudio Monteverdi –  (Sixth book of madrigals for five voices) (Venice: Ricciardo Amadino)
Pietro Pace
The fourth book of madrigals..., Op. 6 (Rome: Giovanni Battista Robletti)
The third book of motets..., Op. 8 (Venice, Giacomo Vincenti)
The fourth book of motets..., Op. 9 (Venice, Giacomo Vincenti)
Serafino Patta – Motetti et madrigali cavati de la poesie sacre... (Venice: Bartolomeo Magni for Gardano)
Michael Praetorius – Syntagma Musicum, part 1.
Thomas Ravenscroft – A Briefe Discourse of the True (but Neglected) Use of Charact'ring the Degrees...

Classical music

Births 
date unknown
Jean-Baptiste de Boësset, composer (died 1685)
Franz Tunder, German organist and composer (died 1667)

Deaths 
September – Giovanni de Macque, composer (born c. 1550)
September 26 or 27 – Felice Anerio, composer (born 1560)

References

 
Music
17th century in music
Music by year